Escalado is a horse racing game created in the United Kingdom in which model race horse game pieces, originally made of lead, would make their way across a long fabric race track towards the finish line at the other end. The horses would move across the race track by means of a mechanical hand crank that vibrated the entire track in a random fashion such that it would simulate the events of a live race.

Escalado was invented and patented in 1928 by Swiss inventor Arthur Gueydan and produced by United Kingdom-based toy company Chad Valley.

Game details
The game is played by at least two players, one of whom must turn the hand crank that moves the game pieces along the track. The players place bets of whatever fashion they prefer on their prediction of which of several distinctively coloured horses will cross the finish line first.

Originally, the game was released with a set of five coloured horses made of lead, a green cloth fabric track, and a mechanical vibrating hand crank. Later versions of the game accommodated a total of eight coloured horses made of non-poisonous metals (and much more recently, plastic) as well as yellow posts on the track that race horses were to navigate around.

History
On 24 August 1928, Swiss inventor and painter Arthur Gueydan applied for a United Kingdom patent being “The Concept of a Device to Impart a Progressive Movement to an Article and applicable in Toys, Game Apparatus, and other Objects". A month later, on 22 September 1928, together with the Chad Valley Company Limited, he applied for another patent for "New or Improved Apparatus for Playing a Race Game".

In May 1929, Toy Trader magazine wrote that Escalado was "The sensational Race game which broke all records during the last three months of 1928, and which is the biggest seller of all our games this year. In March 1946, the game was reintroduced in Toy Trader magazine with an extended track and support for a total of eight horses.

Criticisms
Despite popularity in the early 20th century among children, changing social stigma on gambling  has made the game less appropriate for younger audiences.

In popular culture
The game features as part of the Hawksbee and Jacobs show on Talksport radio (UK). Listeners are invited to send in names of horses based on the main stories of the week and horse-racing tipster Charlie McCann provides the latest "odds" with Andrew McKenna providing a live commentary from the "course".

Roy Cropper was seen playing the game in Coronation Street on 13 September 2015 episode having found it in his friend Cathy's house. He proclaimed it to be his "favourite board game of all time".

A very early vintage edition of the game was restored in season 4, episode 26 of the BBC television series The Repair Shop, a programme in which experts restore family heirlooms and art objects for their owners.

The game was used and spoofed by Victor Lewis-Smith and his comedy partner Paul Sparkes in TV Offal and Bygones.

References

The quoted reference website Mddx Research was closed in 2019

External links
 

Board games introduced in 1928
Racing board games